ASCON (also ASCON Group) is Russian developer of CAD and PDM software and a systems integrator headquartered in Saint Petersburg. The name of the company originates from an abbreviation of an "Automated System for Construction.

The company was founded in 1989 by Alexander Golikov and Tatyana Yankina who previously worked at KB Mashinostroyeniya in Kolomna. In 1993, ASCON signed its first major contract with Zheldorremmash which fueled its development. 

By 2014, the company had over 7000 industrial customers including AutoVAZ, Severstal, Kazzinc, and others. On its home market, ASCON holds a dominant position over its core competitor Autodesk.

Subsidiaries
 C3D Labs
 DEXMA Labs
 Renga Software

Products
 C3D Toolkit
 Renga Architecture
 Renga Structure
 Renga MEP
 KOMPAS-3D
 KOMPAS-Builder
 KOMPAS Graphic
 Pilot-ICE
 Loodsman:PLM
 PDM online
 GulfStream-MRP
 KOMPAS:24 (mobile)
 Machinator (mobile)
 SubDivFormer (mobile)

References

External links
  
  

Companies based in Saint Petersburg
Software companies established in 1989
Russian brands
Multinational companies headquartered in Russia
Technology companies of Russia
1989 establishments in the Soviet Union